The 2018 Just World Indoor Bowls Championship took place at Potters Leisure Resort, Hopton-on-Sea, Great Yarmouth, England, on 12–28 January 2018.

Mark Dawes and Robert Paxton reached the Open singles final with Dawes taking the title on a tie break. Dawes had been the player of the tournament. 
Katherine Rednall won her third singles title defeating Rebecca Field in the final. 
The seventh seeds Mark Dawes and Jamie Chestney won the Open pairs final beating Nick Brett and Greg Harlow. Chestney missed the opportunity to win the first set with his last bowl but gained a three count to draw the set 6–6; the second set was won 9–5, helped by a decisive 5–0 count on end five. Chestney also won the Mixed Pairs title with Lesley Doig.

Northern Ireland's Chloe Watson received the Open Under-25 Singles title after her opponent, defending champion Ellen Ryan, was unable to complete the final as she felt unwell.

Winners

Draw and results

Open singles

Women's singles

Open pairs

+ Furman replaced Paul Foster who withdrew following a family bereavement

Mixed pairs

+ Burnett replaced Paul Foster who withdrew following a family bereavement

Open Under-25 Singles

+ Ellen Ryan defaulted after completing the first set in the final as she was unwell and unable to continue

References

World Indoor Bowls Championship
2018 in bowls
World Indoor Bowls Championship
International sports competitions hosted by England
World Indoor Bowls Championship
Sport in Great Yarmouth
World Indoor Bowls